Delfins was a Portuguese pop-rock band, from Cascais. Its lead vocalist was Miguel Ângelo. Other members of the group were Rui Fadigas, Fernando Cunha, Silvestre Magalhães, Pedro Molkov and João Carlos Magalhães. The band was one of the major pop-rock music groups in Portugal in the 90s, and made various appearances in the Portuguese National Finals for the Eurovision Song Contest.

In 1998, the Delfins contributed "Canção De Engate (In Variações Memory Remix)" to the AIDS benefit compilation album Onda Sonora: Red Hot + Lisbon produced by the Red Hot Organization.

The Band sold more than half a million records, and in 2009 the group officially announced a permanent band retirement.

Albums
1987   Libertação      
1988   U outro lado existe 
1990   Desalinhados
1993   Ser Maior-uma história natural 
1994   Breve Sumário da História de Deus
1996   Saber a Mar
1998   Azul
2000   Del7ins
2002   Babilónia
2005   De Corpo e Alma (Live)

Singles 
1984   Letras 
1985   A Casa da Praia (é apenas um sentimento)
1987   O Caminho da Felicidade 
1988   1 Lugar ao Sol 
1988   Bandeira 
1991   Se eu pudesse um Dia
1993   Ao Passar um Navio
1993   Ser Maior
1995   A Queda de um Anjo
1997   Saber a Mar 
2000   Hoje 
2000   Vive

Compilations 
1995   O Caminho da Felicidade - O melhor dos Delfins 
2003   O Caminho da Felicidade 2

See also
List of best-selling albums in Portugal

External links
Official site
MySpace

Portuguese musical groups
Golden Globes (Portugal) winners
People from Cascais